Ježovy is a municipality and village in Klatovy District in the Plzeň Region of the Czech Republic. It has about 200 inhabitants.

Administrative parts
Villages of Chlumská and Trnčí are administrative parts of Ježovy.

History
The first written mention of Ježovy is from 1251.

References

Villages in Klatovy District